Robert A. Watson (born October 14, 1960) is an American attorney and former Republican member of the Rhode Island House of Representatives, representing the 30th District since 1992. His district includes parts of East Greenwich and West Greenwich. He is a former House Minority Leader. He was arrested twice for marijuana possession and was arrested for a third offense of vandalizing a bank. He resigned in the summer of 2012.

Early life, education, and law career
Watson was born in 1960 in Providence, Rhode Island. Hee attended Bishop Hendricken High School in Warwick. He earned a Bachelor of Arts degree at the University of Denver in 1982, and attended the Columbus School of Law of the Catholic University of America, graduating with a Juris Doctor degree in 1986.  Watson is a practicing attorney and member of the Rhode Island and American Bar Associations.

Rhode Island legislature

Elections
1988–1990
Watson decided to run in Rhode Island's 22nd Senate District, based in East Greenwich and Warwick. In 1990, he ran for re-election but lost to Democrat Michael Lenihan by a narrow margin.

1992–2000
After redistricting, he decided to run in the Rhode Island House of Representatives in 1992 to the 43rd district. He defeated Democrat Linda Seiler and Independent David Zartarian. In 1994, he won re-election to a second term defeating Democrat David Zartarian. In 1996, he won re-election to a third term unopposed. In 1998, he won re-election to a fourth term defeating Democrat Gregory DeGroot. In 2000, he won re-election to a fifth term against Reform party nominee Timothy Miller.

2002–present
Upon redistricting and downsizing of the RI House from 100 to 75 members in 2002, Watson ran in the newly redrawn 30th House District, based in East and West Greenwich. He won re-election to a sixth term unopposed. He ran unopposed in 2004 to his seventh term. In 2006, he won re-election to an eighth term with 57% of the vote. In 2008, he won re-election to a ninth term 54%-46%, winning in eight of nine precincts. In 2010, he won re-election a tenth term with 57% of the vote.

Tenure
In February 2011, he made a joke in private meeting saying "I guess that if you are a Guatemalan gay man who likes to gamble and smokes marijuana, you probably think we're onto some good ideas here."

In 2005, he sponsored legislation that would legalize medical marijuana.

Watson has served as Minority Leader since elected by his caucus in November 1998. He ran for Speaker of the Rhode Island House of Representatives four times. The closest Watson ever got was when Republicans had 12 seats in the State House in 2003.

Committee assignments
During the 2009-2010 legislative session, Watson served on the Health, Education and Welfare Committee and the Joint Committee on Legislative Services. He served as the chairman of the East Greenwich Republican Town Committee from 1990 to 1992. He's also on the Commission on Judicial Tenure and Discipline.

Personal life
He lives in East Greenwich, Rhode Island.

Legal trouble
Watson was stopped in East Haven, Connecticut at a police checkpoint on Friday, April 22, 2011.  He was charged with possession of marijuana and drug paraphernalia after it was noted that a strong odor of marijuana was emanating from his car.  He was also charged with driving under the influence. After further analysis of his urine by the Connecticut Toxicological Lab, Watson's blood alcohol content was determined to be .07, below the legal limit of .08. Traces of marijuana and cocaine were also found.

On Jan 22, 2012 Robert Watson was arrested in South Kingston, RI for possession of marijuana and related paraphernalia. He was found to also have 3 open containers of alcohol in his possession.

On November 6, 2017 Watson was arrested for attacking a bank and then breaking and entering into a neighbor's home. According to the police report he was naked and bleeding at the time.

References

External links

Legislative homepage
  Vote Smart Biography
 State Surge Biography
http://news.providencejournal.com/breaking-news/2012/01/state-lawmaker-1.html

1960 births
Living people
Rhode Island lawyers
University of Denver alumni
Columbus School of Law alumni
Republican Party members of the Rhode Island House of Representatives
People from Kent County, Rhode Island
People from East Greenwich, Rhode Island
Rhode Island politicians convicted of crimes
Republican Party Rhode Island state senators